The Siøsund Bridge is a road bridge that connects the Danish islands of Tåsinge and Siø. It crosses Siøsund, a shallow strait that allowed much of the link to be built as a causeway, the Siø Causeway or Siø Dam.

The bridge is a low box girder bridge that does not allow the passage of ships.

The bridge and causeway are part of route 9 which also connects Tåsinge to Funen via the Svendborgsund Bridge and Siø to Langeland via the Langeland Bridge.

References 

Bridges in Denmark
Box girder bridges
Causeways in Europe
Road bridges in Denmark
1960 establishments in Denmark
Bridges completed in 1960